The White House Office of Domestic Climate Policy (also known as the Climate Policy Office) is an office within the White House Office that is part of the Executive Office of the President of the United States. It is headed by the Assistant to the President and National Climate Advisor (also known as the White House national climate advisor), which is president's chief advisor on domestic climate change policy. In addition, the National Climate Advisor serves as vice-chair of the National Climate Task Force.

The Climate Policy Office differs from the U.S. Special Presidential Envoy for Climate, who coordinates foreign climate policy, as well as the Senior Advisor for Clean Energy Innovation and Implementation, who coordinates clean energy policy. It also differs from the Council on Environmental Quality, which assesses environmental impacts within federal agencies.

History 
The Climate Policy Office has its roots in the White House Office of Energy and Climate Change Policy, which was established under the administration of Barack Obama in 2008 but was folded into the United States Domestic Policy Council in 2011 after Congress refused to fund the office. Carol Browner served as the only director of this office. No equivalent office was established under the administration of Donald Trump.

The position of the National Climate Advisor was established by President Joe Biden on January 20, 2021, and the Climate Policy Office was established on January 27. On December 14, 2020, it was announced that Gina McCarthy, the former administrator of the Environmental Protection Agency under President Barack Obama, would serve as the first national climate advisor, as well as chair of the National Climate Task Force. Former New York deputy secretary of energy and environment, Ali Zaidi, served as the first deputy national climate advisor.

On 16 September 2022, Ali Zaidi was promoted to assistant to the president and national climate advisor. However, the leadership of the Task Force was reshuffled, with the Senior Advisor for Clean Energy Innovation and Implementation becoming Chair and National Climate Advisor moved to vice-chair.

List of Climate Advisors

Structure 

 Assistant to the President & White House National Climate Advisor: Ali Zaidi
 Chief of Staff for the Office of Domestic Climate Policy: Maggie Thomas
 Deputy Assistant to the President & Deputy National Climate Advisor: TBC
 Special Assistant to the President for Climate Policy: David Hayes
 Special Assistant to the President for Climate Policy: John Rhodes
 Special Assistant to the President for Climate Finance: Clare Sierawski
 Special Assistant to the President for Climate Policy and Finance: Jahi Wise
 Special Assistant to the President for Climate Policy, Innovation & Deployment: Sonia Aggarwal
 Senior Advisor for Climate Resilience and Adaptation: Krystal Laymon
 Senior Advisor for Clean Energy Infrastructure: Robert Golden
 Senior Advisor for Climate Policy: Nick Conger
 Senior Director for Industrial Emissions: Trisha Miller
 Senior Director for Transportation Emissions: Austin Brown

See also
 U.S. Special Presidential Envoy for Climate
White House Office on Clean Energy Innovation and Implementation
White House Office of Energy and Climate Change Policy, which existed under the Obama administration

References

External links 

 https://www.whitehouse.gov/cpo/

Executive Office of the President of the United States
2021 establishments in the United States
Politics of climate change
Presidency of Joe Biden